Public housing in France (French: logement social, also called Habitations à loyer modéré, or HLM) is a central, local or social program designed to provide subsidized assistance for low-income and poor people.

History

France has a long tradition of social and state intervention in the provision of housing. In 1775, the Royal Saltworks at Arc-et-Senans was built with a part dedicated to house workers. In the 19th century the cités ouvrières (company towns) appeared, inspired by the Phalanstère of Charles Fourier. After World War II the population increased at a rate previously unknown, the rural exodus increased and war damage had reduced the number of houses in many cities. Rental prices dramatically rose so the government passed a rent control law in 1949. That effectively ended the economic benefits of housing investment. Also, construction was strictly regulated, which made building very difficult without political support.

The government launched a huge construction plan, including the creation of new towns ("villes nouvelles") and new suburbs with HLM (Habitation à Loyer Modéré, "low-rent housing"). The state had the money and the legal means to acquire the land and could provide some advantages to the companies that built the huge housing complexes of hundreds of apartments. Quality was also effectively regulated, resulting in decent or even top-quality housing for the 1950s and 1960s.

HLM construction was also a major source of political financing, and building companies were sometimes made to pay back the political party of the mayor who launched an HLM program. That resulted in corruption scandals in the Paris region and elsewhere.

In 1998, a law required every town in France to have at least 20% HLM.

Different kinds of social housing

 The HLM, Habitations à loyer modéré, can be private or public; they are the most common and house an estimated thirteen million people
 Subsidized housing (built by private sector)
 Co-operatives

Effect on economy
The social housing programs in France have an obvious positive effect on the consumption of the households that benefit from them. There is no consensus about the influence on either the rents of the private sector or the prices of real estate.

See also
 Banlieue
 Minister of Housing (France)
 Public housing

Notes and references

External links
  at Cour des Comptes 

Welfare in France
France